Bebearia hassoni is a butterfly in the family Nymphalidae. It is found in Angola.

References

Butterflies described in 1998
hassoni
Endemic fauna of Angola
Butterflies of Africa